Erus of Lugo (924–941) was a medieval Galician clergyman.

References
 Consello da Cultura Galega (ed.), Documentos da Catedral de Lugo, (Santiago de Compostela, 1998)

924 births
941 deaths
10th-century Galician bishops